Rebutia fiebrigii, the orange crown cactus or flame crown, is a species of flowering plant in the cactus family that is native to exposed rocky plateaux in the Bolivean Andes, at altitudes of  above sea level. In time these balls multiply to form mounds. 

A highly ornamental plant, this is a popular subject for cultivation in a well-drained, dry, sheltered location with plenty of sunlight, which does not freeze in winter. The cultivars ‘Donaldiana’ and the smaller ‘Muscula’ (‘Little Mouse’) have gained the Royal Horticultural Society’s Award of Garden Merit.

Synonyms
Aylostera spegazziniana var. atroviridis
Lobivia steinmannii var. christinae
Rebutia albipilosa 
Rebutia buiningiana 
Rebutia cajasensis
Rebutia christinae 
Rebutia cintiensis 
Rebutia donaldiana 
Rebutia fabrisii 
Rebutia ithyacantha 
Rebutia pulchella 
Rebutia spinosissima 
Rebutia tamboensis 
Rebutia vallegrandensis

References

Flora of Bolivia
Cacti of South America